Dinefwr (also written Dynefwr and anglicised as Dynevor) may refer to:

Places
District of Dinefwr, a local government district of Dyfed, Wales, from 1974 to 1996
Carmarthen East and Dinefwr (UK Parliament constituency), created in 1997
Carmarthen East and Dinefwr (Assembly constituency), created in 1999
Dinefwr Castle, a Welsh castle near Llandeilo, Carmarthenshire
Dinefwr Park National Nature Reserve
Plas Dinefwr, a country house now called Newton House, Llandeilo

People
Baron Dynevor
House of Dinefwr, a royal house of Wales